Walter Bussey (6 December 1904 – January 1982) was an English footballer who played in the Football League for Blackpool, Exeter City, Swansea Town and Stoke City. He made 185 appearances for Stoke.

Career
Bussey was born in Eckington on the Yorkshire border and began working as a collier. Whilst employed in the mines Bussey played amateur football with teams in the Doncaster area. He was spotted by scouts at Stoke City and signed for the club in March 1924 initially retaining his amateur status so he could also turn out for Denaby United. He eventually signed a professional contract in November 1925 becoming one of 34 players used by Tom Mather in 1925–26 as Stoke suffered relegation from the Second Division. Bussey broke into the side in 1926–27 campaign scoring eight goals in 15 appearances as Stoke went on to win the Third Division North title.

Despite lacking in height Bussey became a vital member of Mather's team being used mainly as a playmaker and provided many goals for Charlie Wilson whilst also having a decent scoring record himself. His most prolific season in a Stoke shirt came in the 1928–29 season with saw him score 12 goals in 38 appearances. Whilst Bussey was a clear favourite with Mather and the supporters he was notoriously inconsistent being described as having "spasms of form and scoring".

With the emergence of Harry Ware and Tommy Sale, Bussey left Stoke in October 1933 for Sandy MacFarlane's Blackpool. He scored 9 goals in 27 appearances for the Seasiders before moving on to Swansea Town. He spent two season at the Vetch Field before ending his career with Exeter City. He later worked as a painter and decorator in the Exeter area until his death in January 1982.

Career statistics
Source:

Honours
Stoke City
 Football League Third Division North champions: 1926–27
 Football League Second Division champions: 1932–33

References

1904 births
1982 deaths
People from Eckington, Derbyshire
Footballers from Derbyshire
English footballers
Association football inside forwards
Denaby United F.C. players
Stoke City F.C. players
Blackpool F.C. players
Swansea City A.F.C. players
Exeter City F.C. players
English Football League players